HNK Vukovar '91 was a Croatian football club based in the river port of Vukovar.

Under the name NK Vukovar '91, club was founded in Zagreb by Vukovar refugees during the Croatian War of Independence. In 1992, newly founded Vukovar '91 merged with NK Sloga, an older club based in Vukovar.

The club's greatest success came in the 1998–99 season, when Vukovar won the Croatian second division, earning the team promotion to the Prva HNL. They lasted only one season in the top flight and were relegated after finishing last.

In the 2001–02 season, they finished first in the North Division of Druga HNL but were defeated by Šibenik in a two-legged promotion play-off. In the 2007–08 season they were relegated from Druga HNL, but managed to come back after just one season in the third tier of Croatian football. Their third spell in Druga HNL did not last long and they were relegated once again at the end of 2010–11 season.

In January 2012, the club stepped out from Treća HNL East due to financial difficulties. On 8 February 2012, it was announced that the club was officially dissolved due to high debts. In the summer of 2012, a new club under the name HNK Vukovar 1991 was formed.

List of seasons

References

 
Football clubs in Croatia
Football clubs in Vukovar-Srijem County
Defunct football clubs in Croatia
Association football clubs established in 1991
Association football clubs disestablished in 2012
1991 establishments in Croatia
2012 disestablishments in Croatia
Sport in Vukovar